Diana Mary Organ (née Pugh; born 21 February 1952) is a British Labour Party politician who served as Member of Parliament (MP) for Forest of Dean from 1997 to 2005.

Early life
Her father was Finance Controller of GKN. She went to the independent Edgbaston Church of England College for Girls in Edgbaston, Birmingham (which became the co-ed St. Georges School, Birmingham in 1999). At (then all female) St Hugh's College, Oxford, she gained a BA in Geography in 1973. At the School of Education at the University of Bath, she gained a PGCE in 1974. From Bristol Polytechnic in 1981, she gained a Diploma in Special Education.

From 1974–77, she was an assistant special needs teacher. She was deputy head of St Germans primary school near Saltash, Cornwall from 1977–9. From 1979–82, she was Head of a Special Needs Unit in Somerset. She worked on supply in special schools in Somerset from 1982–8. She was an assistant English teacher in Somerset from 1988–92. She worked as a political researcher for Oxfordshire County Council from 1992–5.

Parliamentary career
Organ contested West Gloucestershire at the 1992 general election, but was not successful. In 1995 she was again selected to stand for Labour, this time through an all-women shortlist.  She was Labour Party Member of Parliament for the re-created seat of Forest of Dean from the 1997 election until she stepped down at the 2005 election, citing changing family circumstances. During her time in Parliament, she voted against the Iraq War.

During the 2009 parliamentary expenses scandal, Organ was required to repay £15,964.01 in respect of falsely claimed expenses relating to mortgage interest payments.

Personal life
She married Richard in 1975. The couple have two daughters.

References

External links
 They Work For You
 
 Ask Aristotle

1952 births
Living people
Labour Party (UK) MPs for English constituencies
Female members of the Parliament of the United Kingdom for English constituencies
UK MPs 1997–2001
UK MPs 2001–2005
Alumni of the University of Bath
Alumni of the University of the West of England, Bristol
Alumni of St Hugh's College, Oxford
20th-century British women politicians
21st-century British women politicians
20th-century English women
20th-century English people
21st-century English women
21st-century English people